Simon of Clermont-Nesle (born after 1250 – died 22 December 1312 or c. February 1313), Peer of France and bishop of Noyon (1297–1301) and Bishop-count of Beauvais (1301–c. 1312).

Simon was one of few bishops that supported King Philip IV "the fair" of France against Pope Boniface VIII (c. 1235–1303), to strengthen the monarchy and make the Church support the state's finances in the time of war, while the Pope demanded the privilege of exemption from tax, in spite of extreme wealth, and proclaimed that the Pope is above every king in authority, but the king engaged the best available lawyers for his case. 
The conflict led in 1309 to the moving of the Papal court, under Pope Clement V (c. 1264–1314), to Avignon, outside the king's realm.

Family background
Simon was a son of Simon II of Clermont, Seigneur of Ailly, Maulette and Nesle (c. 1216–1286) by Adele of Montfort (d. 1279), daughter of Amaury VI of Montfort. The father was a counsellor of King "Saint" Louis IX of France and was appointed regent ("lieutenant") while the king went away on the Seventh Crusade.

Simon had three brothers and at least one sister, whose son was the famous Robert VIII Bertrand (fr), a Marshal of France. His brothers were famous French generals, Raoul of Clermont, Viscount of Châteaudun and Seigneur of Nesle, Constable and Grand Chamberlain of France, and Guy I of Clermont, Marshal of France, Seigneur of Offemont and Ailly, both killed 1302 in the Battle of the Golden Spurs.

Ancestry

References
 FMG: Seigneur Simon II de Clermont and issue
 Family tree of Clermont-Beauvaisis-Nesle 

Bishops of Noyon
Bishops of Beauvais
Medieval French nobility
House of Clermont-Nesle
13th-century births
Year of birth uncertain
1313 deaths
13th-century French people
14th-century French people
People from Picardy
13th-century peers of France
14th-century peers of France